The Sultanate of Sambas (Malay/Indonesian: كسلطانن سمبس, Kesultanan Sambas) was a traditional Malay state on the Western coast of the island of Borneo, in modern-day Indonesia.

History
At first governed by governors, Sambas became a kingdom in 1609 with the descendant of Sepudak. She married one of her daughters to a prince of Sultan Muhammad Hassan of Brunei, Prince Tengah whom later became the first and the last Sultan of Sarawak for Bruneian Empire. The child of this union, Muhammad Saif ud-din I became the first Muslim Sultan of Sambas.

Sambas remained independent until the era of the Dutch East India Company, when the capital was bombarded in 1812. The Dutch took control in 1819, leading into frequent minglings into succession, deposing and exiling Abu Bakar Taj ud-din II to Java.

The state was stable, featuring strong, durable leaders, until the Japanese conquest of 1942, when Sultan Muhammad Ibrahim Shafi ud-din II was executed in the Pontianak Incident at Mandor in 1944. The Sultanate was thereafter suspended and replaced by a Japanese council. It returned with the return of the Dutch in 1946. They installed another Sultan, who died in 1956, ending the line.

From 1984, the head of the Royal House was Winata Kusuma of Sambas, who was recognised as Sultan in 2000 and installed in July 2001. He died in 2008.

The Sultan
The meaning of "Sultan" is "His Highness" and his royal name consists of Sri Paduka al-Sultan Tuanku, followed by his personal reign name, ibni al-Marhum and concludes with his father's reigning titles and his name.

The wife of the Sultan is titled Sri Paduka Ratu .

The Sultanate followed male primogeniture, with the sons of royal wives having precedence over those of common wives.

List of rulers
Panembahan Ratu (King) of Sambas:
 Timbang Paseban (1600–1609)
 Sepudak (1609–1632)
 Anom Kesumayuda (1632–1670)

Sultanate of Sambas:
 Muhammad Shafi ud-din I (1675–1685)
 Muhammad Taj ud-din I (1685–1708)
 Umar Aqam ud-din I (1708–1732)
 Abu Bakar Kamal ud-din I (1732–1764)
 Umar Akam ud-din II (1764–1786)
 Achmad Taj ud-din II (1786–1793)
 Abu Bakar Taj ud-din I (1793–1815)
 Muhammad 'Ali Shafi ud-din I (1815–1828)
 Usman Kamal ud-din (1828–1832)
 Umar Akam ud-din III (1832–1846)
 Abu Bakar Taj ud-din II (1846–1854)
 Umar Kamal ud-din (1854–1866)
 Muhammad Shafi ud-din II (1866–1924)
 Muhammad 'Ali Shafi ud-din II (1924–1926)
 Muhammad Tayeb (Chief of Dewan Majelis Kesultanan Sambas 1926 - 1931)
 Muhammad Ibrahim Shafi ud-din (1931–1943)
 Muchsin Panji Anom (Chief of Dewan Majelis Kesultanan Sambas 1946 - 1950)
 Muhammad Taufik (Head of the Royal Family 1950 - 1984)
 Winata Kusuma (Head of the Royal Family 1984 - 2000, Sultan 2000 - 2008, died 1 February 2008)
 Muhammad Tarhan (Head of the Royal Family since 3 February 2008)

Family tree

External links 
 https://web.archive.org/web/20090125055935/http://bt.com.bn/en/golden_legacy/2009/01/11/sambas_sultanate_descents_from_brunei

Former countries in Borneo
Precolonial states of Indonesia
West Kalimantan
Islamic states in Indonesia
Former sultanates